Saol faoi Shráid (Life Under the Street) is an Irish language live-action puppet television series aimed at three to six-year-olds. The series first aired in October and November 2014 on the TG4 network.

The series follows the adventures of Glibín and Ribín, two "alien" croílín siblings who live in the centre of the earth. When their tunnelling machine breaks down just underneath a residential street, they befriend a trio of insects—Cicí, Rocco and Dris—who have formed a rock band.

A picture book based on the series, Saol faoi Shráid: An Giotár Nua (The New Guitar) by Patricia Forde and Kevin O'Boyle was published by Cló Iar-Chonnacht in August 2015.

References

External links
Meangadh Fíbín production page

2014 Irish television series debuts
TG4 original programming
Irish television shows featuring puppetry
Irish-language television shows
Irish children's television shows
Irish fantasy television series